Tefala is an islet of Funafuti, Tuvalu.

Tefala is part of the Funafuti Conservation Area, established in 1996 with the aim of preserving the natural fauna and flora of the area.

References

Islands of Tuvalu
Pacific islands claimed under the Guano Islands Act
Funafuti